The Devonshire Collection of Period Costume is a collection of historic costumes housed in the Totnes Fashion and Textiles Museum in the town of Totnes, South Devon, in southwest England.

The collection includes clothing for men, women, and children, dating from the 17th to the 21st century. An annually updated exhibition is displayed in Bogan House, a Tudor merchant's house at 43 High Street, Totnes.

See also 
 Totnes Museum
 List of museums in Devon

References

External links 
 Totnes Fashion and Textiles Museum

Museums in Devon
Fashion museums in the United Kingdom
Totnes
Collections of museums in the United Kingdom
History of clothing